is a passenger railway station of the West Japan Railway Company (JR-West) located in the city of Iga, Mie, Japan.

Lines
Sanagu Station is served by the Kansai Main Line, and is located 90.5 rail kilometres from the terminus of the line at Nagoya Station and 30.6 rail kilometers from Kameyama Station.

Layout
The station consists of two side platforms serving two tracks, connected by a footbridge.

Platforms

History
Sanagu Station was opened on January 15, 1897 with the extension of the Kansai Railway from Tsuge Station to Iga-Ueno Station. The Kansai Railway was nationalized on October 1, 1907, becoming part of the Imperial Government Railways (IGR), which became Japan National Railways (JNR) after World War II. Freight operations were discontinued from August 1, 1970. With the privatization of JNR on April 1, 1987, the station came under the control of JR-West.

Bus service
Mie Kotsu: 26 (Tamataki Line): Ayama Branch, for Uenoshi Station

Passenger statistics
In fiscal 2019, the station was used by an average of 105 passengers daily (boarding passengers only).

Surrounding area
Yamato Kaido Sanagu Honjin ruins
 Japan National Route 25
 Fuchu Shrine
 Ryogen-ji Temple

See also
 List of railway stations in Japan

References

External links

  

Railway stations in Japan opened in 1897
Railway stations in Mie Prefecture
Iga, Mie